Praskovya or Praskovia is an old Russian feminine given name. It derives from the Greek female name Paraskeve, meaning "preparation" or "Friday" (Friday being the day of preparation), the name of a martyred 2nd-century saint.

It may refer to
Tsarevna Praskovya Ivanovna of Russia (1694–1731)
Praskovya Bruce (1729–1785), Russian lady-in-waiting and noble
Praskovya Ivanovskaya (1852–1935), Russian revolutionary
Praskovia Kovalyova-Zhemchugova (1768–1803), Russian serf actress and soprano opera singer
Praskovia Saltykova (1664–1723), Russian tsaritsa 
Praskovya Uvarova (1840–1924), Russian archaeologist

References

Russian feminine given names